Kim Wan-ju (born May 25, 1946) is a South Korean politician who was the 32nd governor of the South Korean province of North Jeolla from 2006 to 2014; he was also the mayor of the South Korean city of Jeonju from 1998 to 2006. During his tenure, Kim was a strong proponent of regional development, historical preservation, new paradigms of local and decentralized government, and is considered one of the best of the new generation of South Korean leaders.

Early life and education
Kim was born in what is now North Jeolla Province's Wanju County in May 1946. He graduated from the Jeonju Nam-jung School in 1962 and graduated from Jeonju High School in 1965. He received a Bachelor's in Political Science from Seoul National University (SNU) in 1970 and graduated from SNU's Graduate School of Public Administration in 1963. In 1987, he received a Master's in Urban Planning from the University of Pennsylvania in the U.S.

Career
Passed the 14th Administrative Examination in 1973
1974–1980: Chonbuk Provincial Planning Division Manager
1980–1981: Chonbuk Provincial Office Deputy Director-General
1988–1988: Planning Officer, Chonbuk Provincial Office
1991–1992: Presidential Office of the President
1994: Representative of Namwon's mayor in North Jeolla Province
1994–1995: The 7th and 8th North Jeolla Province Namwon Market
1995–1996: Chief of Planning and Management of North Jeolla Province
1998: Director of the Korea Sports Council
July 1, 1998 – March 10, 2006: Mayor of the City of Jeonju (re-election)
2001–2004 Member of Local Transportation Committee
2003: Chairperson of the Decentralization Special Promotion Committee
2003: Chairman of the Council of the Mayor of the Mayor of the National Market
July 1, 2006 – June 30, 2014: 32nd Governor of North Jeolla Province do in 33rd (re-election)

Personal life
Kim is a member of the Gim clan of Gwangsan.

References

Living people
1946 births
Mayors of places in South Korea
Governors of North Jeolla Province
South Korean expatriates in the United States